Li Ye (born 26 December 1983 in Changchun, Jilin) is a Chinese short track speed skater.

At the 2002 Winter Olympics he won a bronze medal in 5000 m relay, together with teammates Feng Kai, Li Jiajun and Guo Wei.

At the 2006 Winter Olympics he finished fifth in 1000 m and 5000 m relay. He reached the A final in 1500 metres, but was disqualified there.

External links
 
 
Li Ye at ISU
Li Ye at the-sports.org

1983 births
Living people
Chinese male speed skaters
Olympic bronze medalists for China
Olympic short track speed skaters of China
Speed skaters from Changchun
Short track speed skaters at the 2002 Winter Olympics
Short track speed skaters at the 2006 Winter Olympics
Olympic medalists in short track speed skating
Medalists at the 2002 Winter Olympics
Chinese male short track speed skaters
Asian Games medalists in short track speed skating
Short track speed skaters at the 2003 Asian Winter Games
Short track speed skaters at the 2007 Asian Winter Games
Asian Games silver medalists for China
Asian Games bronze medalists for China
Medalists at the 2003 Asian Winter Games
Medalists at the 2007 Asian Winter Games
Universiade medalists in short track speed skating
Universiade bronze medalists for China
Competitors at the 2001 Winter Universiade
21st-century Chinese people